Mumiola is a genus of sea snails, marine gastropod mollusks in the family Pyramidellidae, the pyrams and their allies.

Species
Species within the genus Mumiola include:
 Mumiola carbasea Melvill, 1904
 Mumiola crispata Peñas & Rolán, 2017
 Mumiola epibathra Melvill, 1906
 Mumiola gradatula (Mörch, 1876)
 Mumiola julioferreri Peñas & Rolán, 2017
 Mumiola marquesensis Peñas & Rolán, 2017
 Mumiola myrnae Poppe, Tagaro & Stahlschmidt, 2015
 Mumiola reticosa A. Adams, 1863 
 Mumiola spirata (A. Adams, 1860)
 Mumiola tesselata A. Adams, 1863 
Species brought into synonymy
 Mumiola epentroma (Melvill, 1896): synonym of Costabieta epentroma (Melvill, 1896)
 Mumiola megacheilos (de Folin, 1878): synonym of Mumiola tessellata A. Adams, 1863
 Mumiola superba Saurin, 1959: synonym of Mumiola tessellata A. Adams, 1863

References

 Robba E. (2013) Tertiary and Quaternary fossil pyramidelloidean gastropods of Indonesia. Scripta Geologica 144: 1-191
 Peñas A. & Rolán E. (2017). Deep water Pyramidelloidea from the central and South Pacific. The tribe Chrysallidini. ECIMAT (Estación de Ciencias Mariñas de Toralla), Universidade de Vigo. 412 pp

External links
 Adams, A. (1863). On the species of Pyramidellinae found in Japan. Journal of the Proceedings of the Linnean Society of London. 7: 1-6
 To World Register of Marine Species

Pyramidellidae
Gastropod genera